Jerkic or Jerkić is a surname. Notable people with the surname include:

Rocky Jerkic (born 1989), Australian boxer
Željko Jerkić, Bosnian–Herzegovinian diplomat

See also
Jeric